The 1925 Wellington City mayoral election was part of the New Zealand local elections held that same year. In 1925, elections were held for the Mayor of Wellington plus other local government positions including fifteen councillors. The polling was conducted using the standard first-past-the-post electoral method.

Background
Incumbent Mayor Robert Wright did not seek a third term, but ran as a councillor once again. To replace him, the Civic League initially nominated councillor Thomas Forsyth as their candidate for the mayoralty, but he withdrew in favour of former councillor Charles Norwood. Sitting councillor Charles Chapman was the Labour Party's candidate.

Mayoralty results

Councillor results

References

Mayoral elections in Wellington
1925 elections in New Zealand
Politics of the Wellington Region
1920s in Wellington